Sergio Aure Esquerre (born 20 August 1986) is a Spanish footballer who plays as a goalkeeper for Aldeana.

Career

In 2009, Aure signed for Kitchee, Hong Kong's most successful club, where he made 14 league appearances and scored 0 goals, after playing for Badalona in the Spanish third division.

In 2010, he signed for Moldovan side Milsami after playing for Comarca de Níjar in the Spanish fourth division.

In 2013, he signed for Spanish fifth division team Vinaròs.

Before the 2016 season, Aure signed for Skallagrímur in the Icelandic fifth division.

In 2017, he signed for Spanish seventh division outfit Aldeana.

References

External links
 Sergio Aure at playmakerstats.com
 

Spanish footballers
Association football goalkeepers
Expatriate footballers in Hong Kong
Expatriate footballers in Iceland
Hong Kong Premier League players
Kitchee SC players
FC Milsami Orhei players
1986 births
Spanish expatriates in Hong Kong
Living people
Segunda División B players
Terrassa FC footballers
CF Badalona players
Spanish expatriates in Iceland
Expatriate footballers in Moldova
Footballers from Catalonia
People from Montsià
Sportspeople from the Province of Tarragona